Gabriela Osvaldová (born July 25, 1953, in Prague), also known as Gábina Osvaldová, is a Czech actress and lyricist, best known for her work in Marecek, Pass Me the Pen! (1976). She has been a judge on the reality competition show Česko hledá SuperStar since 2004.

References

Living people
1953 births
Czech actresses
Czech songwriters
Actresses from Prague
Academy of Performing Arts in Prague alumni
20th-century Czech actresses
21st-century Czech actresses